The third season of Vietnam's Got Talent, a Vietnamese reality television talent show, was aired Sunday nights in the prime time slot of 8:00PM (UTC+7) starting from September 8, 2014 on VTV3 and MTV Vietnam. The show is based on the Got Talent series format, which was originated by Simon Cowell in the United Kingdom.

4 judges are Thành Lộc, Thúy Hạnh, Huy Tuấn and Hoai Linh. Thanh Van Hugo replaced Thanh Bach  as presenter.

The show was primarily produced by Vietnam Television and BHD Corp, with additional broadcasting by MTV Vietnam. The performance shows were aired Sundays on VTV3.

Golden buzzer
The judges' auditions also feature the Golden Buzzer. Each judge would have one chance to use the Golden Buzzer. The so-called Golden Acts, those on whom the Golden Buzzer is used, would automatically advance to the Semi-Finals. Hoai Linh was the first to press the Golden Buzzer on Bùi Văn Tự, followed by Thanh Loc on Nhóm 4 chị em  and Huy Tuan on Dương Thị Huỳnh Mai.

Semi-final rounds

The acts are listed of chronological appearance.

1st Semi-final
Celebrity performer:  Paul Cosentino, Âu Bảo Ngân, Minh Thùy

2nd Semi-final
Celebrity performer: Quốc Thiên, Uyên Linh, Trung Dân

3rd Semi-final

4th Semi-final
Celebrity performer: Hồng Nhung, Mạnh Tuấn, An Trần

5th Semi-final
Celebrity performer: Thu Minh

6th Semi-final
Celebrity performer:  Noo Phước Thịnh, Trần Thái Sơn, Nhật Thủy

7th Semi-final

Final rounds
The Final rounds consisted of 14 acts from the semi-final rounds spread out over two shows aired on 22 and 29 March 2015.

Final round 1
The 1st final round was aired on March 22, 2015, filmed in BHD Studio in district 9 of Ho Chi Minh City.

Final round 2
The 2nd final round was aired on April 29, 2015, filmed in BHD Studio in district 9 of Ho Chi Minh City.

Wild Card

Grand Finale
The Grand Finale consisted of the top 4 performance from the final rounds and was aired live on 5 April 2015.

References

Vietnam's Got Talent
2010s Vietnamese television series
2014 Vietnamese television seasons
2015 Vietnamese television seasons